Hexaplex brassica is a species of sea snail, a marine gastropod mollusk in the family Muricidae, the murex snails or rock snails.

Distribution
This species is found offshore in depths to 55 m from Guaymas, in Mexico, south to Peru, and is more commonly indigenous to Costa Rica.

References

Muricidae
Gastropods described in 1822